Chronometree is the fourth studio album by American progressive rock band Glass Hammer, released on May 1, 2000.

It is the first album to feature Susie Bogdanowicz (then named Susie Warren), who is featured as guest backing vocalist in the album and would later join the band as lead singer for subsequent releases. Session member Brad Marler provided all lead vocals for the album.

It is a tongue-in-cheek concept album concerning a young man called Tom, who becomes convinced that aliens are trying to communicate with him through his albums. It is a celebration of the excesses of seventies progressive rock, and uses many of the traditional keyboard sounds of the era in order to strengthen this connection. The band's 2018 seventeenth studio album, Chronomonaut, is a follow-up to Chronometree.

Track listing

Personnel
 Glass Hammer
 Fred Schendel – Hammond organ, Mellotron, Minimoog, synthesizers, acoustic and electric guitars, slide guitar, Autoharp, recorders, drums, backing vocals
 Steve Babb – bass, keyboards, Mellotron, assorted analog synthesizers, backing vocals
 Walter Moore – electric and acoustic guitars, drums on "Chronos Deliverer"

 Additional musicians
 Brad Marler – lead and backing vocals, acoustic guitar
 Arjen Lucassen – additional lead guitar on "All In Good Time"
 Terry Clouse – additional lead guitar
 Susie Warren – backing vocals on "Chronos Deliverer"
 Jamie Watkins – backing vocals on "Chronos Deliverer"
 Sarah Snyder – backing vocals on "Chronos Deliverer"

 Production
 Fred Schendel, Steve Babb – production
 Bruce Huffman – cover art

References

Glass Hammer albums
2000 albums
Concept albums